Adem Alkaşi (born 14 April 1984 in Istanbul) is a Turkish footballer who plays as a right back.

References

External links

Turkish footballers
Samsunspor footballers
Footballers from Istanbul
Süper Lig players
Çankırı Belediyespor footballers
Zeytinburnuspor footballers
Dardanelspor footballers
Elazığspor footballers
1984 births
Living people
TFF First League players
Association football defenders